The Interceptor 400 was a turboprop-powered single-engined light aircraft developed from the Meyers 200 single engine piston plane. It attracted buyers but was unable to obtain adequate manufacturing financing, and was perhaps too far ahead of its time.  In the late 1960s and early 1970s, at the time of its development, the market for single-engined turboprops was still a decade away.

Design and development
Development of the aircraft commenced when Lymon Lyon approached Aero Commander to build him a one-off modification of the 200, to be powered by a turboprop.  His request came just as Aero Commander was realizing that the 200 piston engine aircraft was not economically viable in volumes they sought, and instead, offered to sell Lyon the 200 type certificate and work that Aero Commander had begun on a turbine engine conversion model 400 instead.  Lyon and a group of investors assembled by entrepreneur and merger and acquisition expert Thomas W Itin, then formed the Interceptor Corporation to develop and market the 400 turbine engine version, the Interceptor 400 aircraft.

The plant was moved from the Aero Commander site in Albany, Georgia, to Norman, Oklahoma, where the engineering was completed for the Interceptor 400 type certificate

Its first flight was on June 27, 1969, and certification was obtained in 1971. However, without adequately funded  buyers, major Interceptor investor Paul Luce eventually took possession of the company's intellectual property and the prototype Interceptor 400 when the firm could not repay capital he had loaned it. The rights were then owned by Prop-Jets Inc, in which Luce maintained a 50% stake. Later Prop-Jets changed its name to Interceptor Aircraft Company, with Mr. Luce no longer being involved.  There is one Interceptor 400 plane still registered and still flying.

A militarized version, the Interceptor I400-M reached at least the planning stage. It was envisaged for a wide variety of roles, including training,  reconnaissance, Forward Air Control, and Counterinsurgency, as well as general utility duties.

On May 22, 2014, Global Parts Group, of Augusta, Kansas, announced they had acquired the type certificate of the Interceptor 400 and the Meyers 200 aircraft models.  The Global Parts Group formed a separate affiliate company, Interceptor Aviation Inc., for the ownership of the type certificate, along with all assets and intellectual property related to both the Interceptor 400 and Meyers 200 type designs.  The aircraft design and tooling were discovered in storage in a barn on a farm in Wichita, Kansas.

Specifications (Interceptor 400)

See also

References

 Taylor, John W. R. Jane's All The World's Aircraft 1971–72. London: Sampson Low, Marston & Co, 1971. .

External links
 Meyers Aircraft Home Page
 Meyers Aircraft Owner Community by Type Certificate and OEM assets holder, Global Parts Group, Inc.
 Aviation Journalist Bud Davisson's review of the Interceptor 400

1960s United States civil utility aircraft
Single-engined turboprop aircraft
Single-engined tractor aircraft
Low-wing aircraft
Aircraft first flown in 1969